At least two ships of the French Navy have been named after the explorer Francis Garnier:

 , previously the Italian sloop Eritrea she was acquired in 1948 and expended in a nuclear test in 1966
 , a  launched in 1973 and stricken in 2011

French Navy ship names